Li Ronghua (Chinese: 李荣华, born 21 September 1956) is a female Chinese rowing cox. She competed at the 1988 Seoul and 1992 Barcelona Summer Olympic Games. Together with her teammates, she won a silver medal in women's coxed four and a bronze medal in women's eight in 1988.

References

Chinese female rowers
Rowers at the 1988 Summer Olympics
Rowers at the 1992 Summer Olympics
Olympic rowers of China
Olympic silver medalists for China
Olympic bronze medalists for China
Living people
1956 births
Olympic medalists in rowing
Asian Games medalists in rowing
Rowers at the 1986 Asian Games
Medalists at the 1988 Summer Olympics
Asian Games gold medalists for China
Medalists at the 1986 Asian Games
Coxswains (rowing)
20th-century Chinese women
21st-century Chinese women